Judith C. Russell (born 1944) is the current dean of University Libraries at the University of Florida.  She is the first dean of the University of Florida George A. Smathers Libraries, with the position elevated to the dean rank from a directorship to reflect the increased importance of the libraries and information for the University of Florida. She has held this position since May 2007.

Superintendent of Documents at the U.S. Government Printing Office
Prior to her position at the University of Florida, Russell served as the 22nd superintendent of documents at the U.S. Government Printing Office from 2003 to 2007. It was her responsibility to provide public access to government information published by the U.S. Congress, Federal agencies and the federal courts. As the superintendent of documents, she was responsible for a staff of 220 employees with an annual budget of $70 million.  From 1998 to 2003 she served as the deputy director for the U. S. National Commission on Libraries and Information Science (NCLIS).

Education
Bachelor's degree from the Dunbarton College of the Holy Cross
Master's degree in library science from Catholic University of America

Publications
 Meeting the Information Needs of the American People: Past Actions and Future Initiatives

References

External links

University of Florida George A. Smathers Libraries

1944 births
Living people
Catholic University of America alumni
University of Florida faculty